God's Helicopter is a young-adult novel by the American writer Lee Gutkind.

It is set in 1950s Pittsburgh, Pennsylvania when Dwight Eisenhower was president, Ralph Kiner was the left fielder for the Pittsburgh Pirates and the greatest man to ever live, according to the twelve-year-old Willie Heinemann, protagonist of this novel. His friend Ronald Middlebaum, however, fights a life-threatening illness and Willie seeks to understand a God who wants Middlebaum dead.

References

1983 American novels
Novels set in Pittsburgh
Novels set in the 1950s